María Emilia Forcherio (born 16 February 1995) is an Argentinian field hockey player.

Hockey career 
In 2020, Forcherio was called into the senior national women's team.

References

Living people
1995 births
Argentine female field hockey players
Field hockey players from Buenos Aires
Olympic silver medalists for Argentina
Medalists at the 2020 Summer Olympics
Olympic medalists in field hockey
Field hockey players at the 2020 Summer Olympics
Olympic field hockey players of Argentina
Competitors at the 2022 South American Games
South American Games silver medalists for Argentina
South American Games medalists in field hockey
21st-century Argentine women